The 2026 Russian legislative election will be held in Russia no later than 20 September 2026. At stake are 450 seats in the State Duma of the 9th convocation, the lower house of the Federal Assembly. Going into the election, United Russia is the ruling party after winning the 2021 election with 49.8% of the vote, taking 324 seats.

Electoral system

Under current Russian election laws. the State Duma service term is limited to five years and each seat is allotted through a parallel voting. Half of the seats (225) are elected by party-list proportional representation with a 5% electoral threshold in number of votes. The other half elected in 225 single-member constituencies (circuits) by first-past-the-post voting (plurality voting). In the proportional part, candidates can be nominated only by political parties, and the lists of parties must include at least 200 and no more than 400 candidates; the list may also include candidates who are not members of the party, but their number should not exceed 50% of the number of candidates on the list. The party list of candidates should be divided into federal and regional parts, which include regional groups of candidates corresponding to the group of bordering federal subjects of Russia. The number of regional groups must be at least 35, and no more than fifteen candidates may be included in the federal part of the list of candidates. The regional parts of the party list should cover the entire territory of Russia.

In the majoritarian part, candidates can be nominated both by political parties and in the order of self-nomination. The political party must provide a list of candidates to the Central Election Commission, and the list must contain the name and number of the constituencies in which each candidate would run. Documents of candidates-self-nominees, unlike candidates from political parties, have to submit applications to District Election Commissions. For registration, the self-nominated candidate must collect at least 3% of the signatures of voters residing in the constituency, or at least 3,000 signatures if the constituency has less than 100,000 voters. One and the same candidate can be nominated both in the party list and in the single-member constituency; however, in the case of their passage to the State Duma and the party list and in the single-member constituency, they would need to give up one of the places. They usually refuse the seat received on the party list, as in this case the party does not lose this seat and simply would pass it on to another candidate.

Political parties

As of September 2021, 32 political parties are registered in Russia. Parties represented in the State Duma (in this case, seats must be obtained in the vote on the party list), parties that received more than 3% of the vote (by party list) in the previous election or are represented at least in one of the regional parliaments (also by party list) are allowed to contest in the elections without collecting signatures. Other parties need to collect 200,000 signatures if they  have also held conventions and nominated candidates to participate in the elections. The official list of parties entitled to participate in the elections without collection of signatures was announced before the election. After the 2021 federal and regional elections, there are only 15 such parties.

Parliamentary parties

Regional parliamentary parties
Parties represented in regional parliaments, which can also participate in legislative elections without collecting signatures (the list does not include parties already represented in the State Duma).

Opinion polls

References

Russia2026Legislative
Russia2026Legislative
Legislative elections in Russia
Future elections in Russia